Dhu Khairan is a sub-district located in the Al Ashah District, 'Amran Governorate, Yemen. Dhu Khairan had a population of 7380 according to the 2004 census.

References 

Sub-districts in Al Ashah District